Zurab Achba (23 February 1950  15 August 2000) is an assassinated politician from Abkhazia.

Early life
Zurab Achba was born on 23 February 1950. He attended Sukhumi's secondary school no. 10 named after Nestor Lakoba and graduated from the Law Faculty of the Moscow State University.

Career 
Achba was a member of the People's Assembly of Abkhazia. Between 1990 and 1992, he was Vice Chairman of Aidgylara. During the nineties, he had been critical of President Vladislav Ardzinba. There were rumours that Achba would run for president in the 1999 presidential election, which he dismissed in an interview with Nuzhnaya Gazeta as a "nightmare of an idea".

Death 
Achba was shot dead from a passing car in front of his house on 15 August 2000.

References

1950 births
2000 deaths
2000 in Abkhazia
Assassinated Abkhazian politicians
1st convocation of the People's Assembly of Abkhazia
People murdered in Georgia (country) 
2000 murders in Georgia (country)